Shaquille Doorson (born 26 February 1994) is a Dutch basketball player for Aris Leeuwarden of the BNXT League.

Early life and career
Born in Amsterdam, Doorson started playing basketball at the age of 18, after playing football before. He joined the Under-20 team of Apollo Amsterdam. In the 2012–13 season, he made his debut with Apollo's senior team in the Dutch Basketball League, playing two games. He made his DBL debut on 30 March 2013, playing 14 minutes in a loss against Den Bosch. Later, he moved to Spain to join the Canarias Basketball Academy.

College career
Doorson was scouted in Spain by Rutgers and joined the team in 2014. In his second season, he suffered a foot injury and was sidelined for the entire season. In his senior year, he started in all 31 games for the Scarlet Knights and averaged 3.7 points and 4.3 rebounds per game.

Professional career
In July 2019, Doorson signed his first professional contract with Marín Peixegalego in the Spanish LEB Oro. He averaged 6.6 points and 5.6 rebounds over 24 games.

Doorson started the 2020–21 season with Melilla, also in the LEB Oro. In November, he agreed with the team to terminate his contract after appearing in four games. 

In December 2020, Doorson transferred to Estonian club Rapla. He averaged 7.6 points and 5.4 rebounds in the LEBL.

On 9 July 2021, Doorson signed with Aris Leeuwarden of the BNXT League, marking his return to his native country.

Career statistics

Personal
Doorson was named after Basketball Hall of Famer Shaquille O'Neal.

References

1997 births
Living people
Apollo Amsterdam players
Aris Leeuwarden players
Basketball players from Amsterdam
Centers (basketball)
Club Melilla Baloncesto players
Dutch Basketball League players
Dutch expatriate basketball people in Spain
Dutch men's basketball players
Rapla KK players